Steven Universe: The Movie is a 2019 American animated musical television film based on the animated television series Steven Universe created by Rebecca Sugar. The film is directed by Sugar, alongside co-directors Joe Johnston and Kat Morris, and stars Zach Callison, Estelle, Michaela Dietz, Deedee Magno Hall, and Sarah Stiles, alongside an ensemble cast reprising their roles from the television series. Steven Universe: The Movie takes place two years after the events of the series finale "Change Your Mind", and follows the Crystal Gems as they attempt to save all organic life on Earth from a deranged Gem with a history with Steven's mother.

The film was announced at San Diego Comic-Con 2018, and a short teaser trailer was later released on Cartoon Network's YouTube channel. At San Diego Comic-Con 2019, a trailer for the film was released, along with the announcement of a documentary based on the film's creation to be released along with the DVD. The film premiered on Cartoon Network on September 2, 2019, to 1.57 million viewers. It was the first Cartoon Network original film since 2015's Regular Show: The Movie.

The film takes place between the original Steven Universe series and its follow-up, Steven Universe Future.

Plot 
After an introduction from the Diamonds ("The Tale of Steven"), Steven Universe, now 16 years old, greets the citizens of the Gem Empire. The Diamonds want him to stay to fulfill his mother Pink Diamond's role as a leader ("Let Us Adore You"), but he refuses. Back on Earth, the Crystal Gems celebrate their newfound peace ("Happily Ever After"). Almost immediately, a giant drill lands on the hillside, and Spinel, a deranged and cartoonish Gem, appears, announcing her intent to kill Steven and the rest of the Earth ("Other Friends"). Using a scythe-like weapon, she "poofs" Pearl, Garnet, and Amethyst back into their gem forms; her attacks also weaken Steven's Gem powers, though his body is unharmed. Steven manages to poof Spinel with the scythe.

Steven calls his father, Greg, for help. The Gems regenerate their bodies (including Ruby and Sapphire separately), but their memories somehow have been erased; Pearl assumes that she is Greg's servant ("system/BOOT.pearl_final(3).Info"). With her memories gone, Spinel is a goofy and happy-go-lucky Gem whose function is to entertain her companion. Steven seeks advice from Peridot, Lapis Lazuli, and Bismuth; they try to raise Steven's spirits ("Who We Are"). Bismuth recognizes Spinel's weapon as a "Rejuvenator", a device used to reset the minds of rebellious Gems back to their default state. Spinel compares the situation to a puzzle, suggesting that they find the Gems' "missing pieces" to restore their memories, inspiring Steven to try to reenact Ruby and Sapphire's first fusion. Spinel's antics cause scaffolding to collapse, almost crushing Ruby; when Sapphire shoves her to safety, they fuse into Garnet ("Isn't It Love?"), but she still has no memory of her life.

After Steven recovers Amethyst's memory by reenacting experiences the two had together ("No Matter What"), Peridot discovers that Spinel's drill is injecting a toxic chemical that will kill all life on Earth. In a moment of panic, Steven attempts to remove the injector, but his weakened efforts only serve to accelerate the process. In order to revive Pearl's memory, the group takes her to a Sadie Killer and the Suspects concert, hoping their music will bring back her memories of rebellion ("Disobedient"), but Pearl insists that as long as Greg exists, she will obey him. Steven uses what little energy he has left to fuse with Greg ("Independent Together"), which enables Pearl to recover her memory. She tells Steven that Spinel was once Pink Diamond's playmate; overcome with sadness, Spinel flees.

Steven follows Spinel to a desolate garden in space, where she reveals her backstory: When Pink Diamond began the Gem colonization of Earth and did not want Spinel to join her, she tricked Spinel into "playing a game", in which Spinel was to stand frozen in the garden. Spinel was left there alone for 6,000 years before learning that Pink Diamond no longer exists ("Drift Away"). Steven tells her that he will never abandon her and that he will make up for his mother's mistakes ("Found").

Back in Beach City, Spinel turns off the injector, but when Steven begins shifting his attention back to everyone else, she accuses Steven of just using her, suggesting he'll abandon her or wipe her memory again. She turns the injector back on and attacks Steven. As he tries to explain the truth to her, Garnet recovers her memory ("True Kinda Love"). Steven sends the others to rescue the humans of Beach City while he confronts Spinel. Steven finally realizes why his Gem powers have not yet returned: his desire for an unchanging "happily ever after" has left him resistant to the notion of growth and change, which he needs to re-experience. Embracing this fact, he regains his powers and battles Spinel, trying to convince her that she can change as well ("Change"). Their fight destroys the injector, and Spinel relents after realizing how much she hates what she has become.

The Diamonds suddenly arrive, intending to live on Earth with Steven. He introduces Spinel to them and they take an immediate liking to her because of her goofy personality, and how she reminds them of Pink ("Let Us Adore You (Reprise)"). The Diamonds accept her in place of Steven and she happily goes with them, now with people who will love her unconditionally. Steven and his friends gather to rebuild Beach City, and Steven, Connie, Pearl, Garnet, Amethyst, and Greg perform a Takarazuka-style "Finale".

Cast 

The film features the main and recurring characters of the series, and introduces the new characters Spinel and Steg.
 Zach Callison as Steven Universe, a 16-year-old Gem-human hybrid member of the Crystal Gems.
 Sarah Stiles as Spinel, the former playmate of Pink Diamond, Steven's late mother. She is drawn in a "rubber-hose" style of 1930s animation and originally had a childlike personality before becoming vengeful about Pink Diamond abandoning her.
 Michaela Dietz as Amethyst, one of the Crystal Gems.
 Deedee Magno Hall as Pearl, one of the original members of the Crystal Gems.
 Estelle Swaray as Garnet, a fusion who is the de facto leader of the Crystal Gems.
Erica Luttrell as Sapphire, one of Garnet's components, a cool and collected precognitive Gem and spouse of Ruby.
Charlyne Yi as Ruby, one of Garnet's components, a hotheaded soldier Gem and spouse of Sapphire.
 Uzo Aduba as Bismuth, one of the original members of the Crystal Gems.
 Jennifer Paz as Lapis Lazuli, a member of the Crystal Gems who was formerly aligned with Homeworld.
 Shelby Rabara as Peridot, a member of the Crystal Gems who was formerly aligned with Homeworld.
 Grace Rolek as Connie Maheswaran, Steven's best friend.
 Tom Scharpling as Greg Universe, Steven's father.
 Christine Ebersole as White Diamond, the leader of the Great Diamond Authority, who rules over the Gem race.
 Patti LuPone as Yellow Diamond, a member of the Great Diamond Authority.
 Lisa Hannigan as Blue Diamond, a member of the Great Diamond Authority.
 Matthew Moy as Lars Barriga, a friend of Steven.
 Kate Micucci as Sadie Miller, a friend of Steven.
 Ted Leo as Steg, the fusion of Steven and Greg Universe.
 Aimee Mann as Opal, the fusion of Pearl and Amethyst.
 Toks Olagundoye as Nanefua Pizza, the mayor of Beach City.

Production 

The film is a musical, with songs written by the series creator Rebecca Sugar featuring musical collaborations with Aivi & Surasshu, Chance the Rapper, Gallant, James Fauntleroy, Macie Stewart, Mike Krol, Grant Henry (Stemage), Jeff Liu, Jeff Ball, and Julian "Zorsy" Sanchez, as well as Estelle, Ted Leo, and Aimee Mann, who have voice roles. Lena Raine is also credited for song and score mixing. The film is executive produced by Rebecca Sugar. The co-executive producers are Chance the Rapper, Kat Morris, Joe Johnston, Alonso Ramirez Ramos and Ian Jones-Quartey. The film was directed by Rebecca Sugar, Kat Morris, and Joe Johnston. The story for the film was developed by Ben Levin, Hilary Florido, Ian Jones-Quartey, Jack Pendarvis, Joe Johnston, Kat Morris, Matt Burnett, and Rebecca Sugar.

Marketing 
The film was announced at San Diego Comic-Con 2018, and a short teaser trailer was later released on Cartoon Network's YouTube channel. A poster was released a week before San Diego Comic-Con 2019, revealing a glimpse of the film's antagonist and a visibly older Steven, setting the film two years after the events of "Change Your Mind".

At San Diego Comic-Con 2019, a trailer for the film was released, along with the announcement of a documentary based on the film's creation to be released along with the DVD.

Adult Swim's action-oriented Toonami block aired a second trailer for the film during their August 24 broadcast.

Release 
The film was released on September 2, 2019, on Cartoon Network; the Every Steven Ever marathon aired leading up to the film, followed by a digital release on September 3. The film was released on DVD by Warner Bros. Home Entertainment on November 12, 2019; this release contains the documentary Behind the Curtain: The Making of Steven Universe: The Movie and animatics both with and without commentary. The film was later released on the Steven Universe: The Complete Collection DVD on December 8, 2020, alongside the entirety of the original series and Future.

International 
The film has been released among various international Cartoon Network feeds. In Australia, the film released on the streaming service Stan on September 30, 2019. In the United Kingdom and Ireland, the film was released a month later on October 1, 2019. In France, the film was premiered on October 27, 2019. In Romania, Hungary, and the Czech Republic, the film premiered on May 9, 2020. In Poland, the film premiered on May 17, 2020. In Germany, the film premiered on May 30, 2020.

Premieres 

 United States: September 2, 2019
 Canada: September 7, 2019
 Philippines: September 28, 2019
 Australia: September 30, 2019 (streaming on Stan)
 Hong Kong: September 2019 (streaming)
 United Kingdom, Ireland, Malta: October 1, 2019
 Brazil, Latin America: October 7, 2019
 Argentina, Paraguay, Uruguay: October 24, 2019 (theatrically)
 France, Monaco, Belgium, Luxembourg, Switzerland, (French Africans): October 27, 2019
 Taiwan, Indonesia, Malaysia, Vietnam, Thailand, Singapore: December 21, 2019
 Italy, San Marino, Switzerland: March 20, 2020
 Hungary, Czech Republic, Romania, Moldova, Slovakia: May 9, 2020 
 Poland: May 17, 2020
 Austria, Liechtenstein, Luxembourg, Germany, Switzerland: May 4, 2020 (VOD) / May 30, 2020 (TV)
 Netherlands: May 31, 2020
 Portugal: July 3, 2020 (CN Premium) / August 29, 2020 (TV)
 Spain: September 18, 2020 (HBO Spain)
 Denmark: October 3, 2020 (theatrically)
 Japan: December 24, 2020 (subtitled version) (Boomerang Japan) / May 21, 2022 (subtitled version) (Cartoon Network Japan)
 Sweden, Norway, Finland, Denmark: January 15, 2021 (HBO Nordic)
 Turkey: September 19, 2021 (Sinema TV Aile)

Theatrical 
In Argentina, Paraguay and Uruguay, the film was released theatrically from October 24 to October 30, 2019, in Cinemark Theatres.

A one-night theatrical sing-along screening through Fathom Events was planned for March 23, 2020, including a premiere screening of an episode of Steven Universe Future, but the event was cancelled due to the COVID-19 pandemic. Instead, the sing-along edition of the film premiered on Cartoon Network on March 6, 2020, preceding 2 new episodes of Future, while the attached episode was released digitally on the event's original date.

Through its limited run, the film made $24,012 at the international box-office.

Reception

Viewership 
Steven Universe: The Movie was seen by 1.57 million viewers on its original telecast, which was commercial-free. This made the film the highest-rated broadcast of the series in over three years.

Critical response 
The film was universally acclaimed by critics prior to broadcast, with the music, animation and characters highlighted in particular.

Rotten Tomatoes gives the film  approval rating based on  reviews.

Speaking of its effectiveness as a stand-alone story in Forbes, Dani Di Placido described the film as "both approachable to newcomers and deeply rewarding for longtime fans of the series". ComicBook.com's Rollin Bishop summarised that the film contains "amazing musical numbers with striking illustrations and breathtaking animation to outdo anything the franchise has attempted before", while Shamus Kelley of Den of Geek commented on the strong emotional content, saying that "this is a movie that will stick with you long after it’s finished airing. Like the best entertainment, it holds up a mirror and lets you examine your life in a safe way".

Accolades

Music 

The first single from the film's soundtrack, "True Kinda Love", performed by Estelle and Callison, was released on July 19, 2019. The soundtrack was released on September 1, 2019.

The soundtrack peaked at number 57 on the US Billboard 200 chart, number 6 on the Independent Albums chart, and number 5 on the Soundtracks chart. Additionally, two songs from the soundtrack charted on the Billboard Kid Digital Songs chart. "Other Friends" and True Kinda Love" peaked at number 1 and number 8 respectively. The song "Happily Ever After" was later adapted into the title theme of the epilogue limited series Steven Universe Future.

A deluxe version (featuring demo versions of a few songs) was released on November 15, 2019.

References

External links 

 
 Official Website

2010s American animated films
2010s children's animated films
2010s children's fantasy films
2010s musical fantasy films
2019 animated films
2019 television films
2019 films
American children's animated space adventure films
American children's animated science fantasy films
American children's animated musical films
American disaster films
American fantasy adventure films
American science fiction action films
Animated films about friendship
Animated films about revenge
Animated films based on animated series
Apocalyptic films
Cartoon Network Studios animated films
Films based on television series
Films set in the United States
American musical television films
Steven Universe
Television films based on television series
LGBT-related animated films
Lesbian-related films
LGBT-related science fiction films
2010s English-language films
Rough Draft Studios films